Abou-Malal Ba (born 29 July 1998) is a French professional footballer who plays as a midfielder for Belgian club Seraing on loan from Nantes.

Club career
Ba made his professional debut with AS Nancy in a 0–0 Ligue 2 tie with Nîmes Olympique on 14 August 2017. He signed his first professional contract with Nancy on 20 September 2017.

On 5 September 2020, he joined Italian club Cosenza on a season-long loan.

On 7 August 2021, he moved on loan to Alessandria.

On 1 September 2022, Ba switched to Seraing in Belgium on a new loan.

Career statistics

Club

References

External links
 
 
 
 
 

1998 births
People from Saint-Dié-des-Vosges
Sportspeople from Vosges (department)
Footballers from Grand Est
French sportspeople of Senegalese descent
Living people
French footballers
France youth international footballers
Association football midfielders
AS Nancy Lorraine players
FC Nantes players
Aris Thessaloniki F.C. players
Cosenza Calcio players
U.S. Alessandria Calcio 1912 players
R.F.C. Seraing (1922) players
Ligue 2 players
Super League Greece players
Serie B players
Belgian Pro League players
French expatriate footballers
Expatriate footballers in Greece
French expatriate sportspeople in Greece
Expatriate footballers in Italy
French expatriate sportspeople in Italy
Expatriate footballers in Belgium
French expatriate sportspeople in Belgium